Lucas Arnold Ker and Martín García were the defending champions, but competed this year with different partners. Arnold Ker teamed up with Pablo Albano and lost in quarterfinals to Devin Bowen and Mariano Hood, while García teamed up with Tomás Carbonell and lost in semifinals to Alberto Martín and Eyal Ran.

Alberto Martín and Eyal Ran won the title by defeating Devin Bowen and Mariano Hood 7–6(7–4), 6–1 in the final.

Seeds

Draw

Draw

References

External links
 Official Results Archive (ATP)
 Official Results Archive (ITF)

2001 Doubles
Doubles
2000 in Romanian tennis